The 2015–16 season was Dunav Ruse's third time in the B Group, after promotion from the V Group.

Current squad 
As of 20 May 2016

Bulgarian B Professional Football Group

Table

Results summary

Fixtures and results

Bulgarian Cup

FC Dunav Ruse seasons
Dunav Ruse